The GEXcel International Collegium for Advanced Transdisciplinary Gender Studies is an inter-university centre of excellence in gender studies based in Sweden, which "aims to develop transnational, intersectional and transformative gender research, and to become a meeting place for different generations of excellent gender scholars." It is hosted by the Center for Feminist Social Studies at Örebro University, Linköping University and Karlstad University.

It was established in 2012 as the permanent continuation of the Centre of Gender Excellence (GEXcel), that was established by the Swedish Research Council at Örebro University and Linköping University in 2006 and that existed until the end of 2013. Its stated aim was to evolve into a more permanent European centre of excellence "dedicated to advanced, transnational and transdisciplinary gender research." Its affiliates include many internationally leading researchers in the field of gender studies.

GEXcel and Routledge are responsible for the book series Routledge Advances in Feminist Studies and Intersectionality, which began publication in 2010.

Its research activities were ranked as "very good to outstanding" by the Swedish Research Council in a 2011 evaluation.

Notable academics
Ursula Apitzsch
Margunn Bjørnholt
Valerie Bryson
Cynthia Cockburn
Ann Ferguson
Anita Göransson
Jeff Hearn
Liisa Husu
Stevi Jackson
Sheila Jeffreys
Anna G. Jónasdóttir
Kathleen B. Jones
Michael Kimmel
Nina Lykke
Kathleen Lynch
Louise Morley
Robert Morrell
Teresa Rees
Gloria Wekker

References

External links
Centre of Gender Excellence
 

Örebro University
Linköping University